The 2021–22 Ukrainian Second League was the 31st season since its establishment.

The competition was terminated at the PFL Council meeting on 6 May 2022 due to the 2022 Russian invasion of Ukraine.

Summary 
On June 1, 2021, the PFL Central Council adopted decision that new season competitions in the PFL Second League would start on July 25, 2021, just as competitions in all professional leagues in Ukraine. The competition format and league composition corresponds to the PFL program "Strategy of Development" that was adopted back in 2016. 

As the previous season the top 2 teams from each group get promoted to the First League. There also is expected to be a play-off game.

Teams

Promoted teams 
Twelve teams have been promoted from the 2020–21 Ukrainian Football Amateur League:
 Karpaty Lviv – 4th place of Group 1 (debut, last season original Karpaty Lviv withdrew) 
 MFA Mukachevo – 8th place of Group 1 (debut, another club from Mukachevo, Karpaty, last competed in 1996–97) 
 Viktoriya Mykolaivka – 1st place of Group 2 (debut) 
 LNZ Cherkasy – 2nd place of Group 2 (debut)
 Livyi Bereh Kyiv – 6th place of Group 2  (debut) 
 AFSC Kyiv – 9th place of Group 2 (debut) 
 Lyubomyr Stavyshche – 10th place of Group 2 (debut)
 Vovchansk – 2nd place of Group 3  (debut) 
 Sumy – 3rd place of Group 3 (debut, a phoenix club based on LS Group Sumy Raion with another FC Sumy last competed at this level in 2011–12) 
 Skoruk Tomakivka – 4th place of Group 3  (debut) 
 SC Poltava – 5th place of Group 3  (debut, another FC Poltava last competed at this level in 2011–12) 
 Trostianets – 6th place of Group 3  (debut)

Relegated teams 
Two teams have been relegated from the 2020–21 Ukrainian First League:
 MFC Mykolaiv – 4th place (the club decision to relegate)
 Krystal Kherson – 16th place (returning after a season)

Withdrawn and merged teams 
 Obolon-2 Bucha – withdrawn before the season
 Volyn-2 Lutsk – withdrawn before the season
 MFC Mykolaiv-2 – Reserve club withdraw due to parent club relegated
 FC Karpaty Lviv, officially liquidated, the 2020–21 playing and coaching staff joined FC Karpaty Halych

Location map 
The following map displays the location of teams. Group A teams marked in red. Group B teams marked in green.

Stadiums

Managers

Managerial changes

Group A

Results

Notes:

Top goalscorers

Number of teams by region (Group A)

Group B

Results

Top goalscorers

Number of teams by region (Group B)

Post-season play-offs
Following the league season (double round-robin tournament), winners of both group are expected to meet to contest the 2021–22 Second League championship title. In addition, the third placed teams in each group expected to contest a single berth for promotion play-off with the 12th place team of the 2021–22 First League.

Championship game

Promotion play-offs

Awards

Round awards

See also
 2021–22 Ukrainian Premier League
 2021–22 Ukrainian First League
 2021–22 Ukrainian Football Amateur League
 2021–22 Ukrainian Cup
 List of Ukrainian football transfers summer 2021

References

External links
 У Другій лізі скасували ліміт на легіонерів у заявці. UA-Football. 27 June 2021

Ukrainian Second League seasons
2021–22 in Ukrainian association football leagues
Ukraine
Sports events affected by the 2022 Russian invasion of Ukraine